Maoritomella eva is a species of sea snail, a marine gastropod mollusk in the family Borsoniidae.

Description
The height of the shell is 4.8 mm, and its width is 2.2 mm.

Distribution
This marine species occurs off the Agulhas Bank, South Africa

References

 Thiele, J. "Gastropoda der Deutschen Tiefsee-Expedition II. Wissenschaftliche Ergebnisse der Deutschen Tiefsee-Expedition auf dem Dampfer "Valdivia" 1898–1899, 17, 35–382." (1925).
 R.N. Kilburn, Turridae (Mollusca: Gastropoda) of southern Africa and Mozambique. Part 3. Subfamily Borsoniinae; Annals of the Natal Museum, 1986 - reference.sabinet.co.za

External links
 
  Barnard K.H. (1958), Contribution to the knowledge of South African marine Mollusca. Part 1. Gastropoda; Prosobranchiata: Toxoglossa; Annals of The South African Museum v. 44 p. 73–163 (described as Asthenotoma eva )
  Bouchet P., Kantor Yu.I., Sysoev A. & Puillandre N. (2011) A new operational classification of the Conoidea. Journal of Molluscan Studies 77: 273–308

Endemic fauna of South Africa
eva
Gastropods described in 1925